Meadow Bridge may refer to a location in the United States:

Meadow Bridge, West Virginia, a town
Meadow Bridge (Shelburne, New Hampshire), a bridge

See also
Battle of Meadow Bridge, an 1864 skirmish near Richmond, Virginia, in the American Civil War